Brigitte Gros (12 June 1925 – 11 March 1985) was a French journalist and politician. She served as the mayor of Meulan-en-Yvelines and as a member of the French Senate. She was the author of several books.

Early life
Brigitte Gros was born as Brigitte Servan-Schreiber on 12 June 1925 in Saint-Germain-en-Laye, France. Her father, Émile Servan-Schreiber, was a Jewish author. Her mother, Denise Brésard, was Roman Catholic.

During World War II, she joined the French Resistance and served in the maquis of Ain under Léo Hamon. However, she was arrested and tortured by the Gestapo on 15 August 1944. During the liberation of France, she served under General Jean de Lattre de Tassigny. She was a recipient of the Croix de Guerre for her service.

Career
Gros first worked as a journalist for Les Échos and Paris-Presse. She joined L'Express in 1955. She published her first novel in 1960.

Gros was elected to the city council of Meulan in 1965. She served as its mayor from 1966 to 1985. During her tenure, she oversaw the construction of the Paradis neighbourhood and the Henri-IV Hospital in Meulan.

Gros served as a member of the French Senate from 1977 to 1985. During her tenure, she worked on policies to support low-income housing known as HLM. Additionally, she argued that each French family should be able to own a house. Meanwhile, she authored a report in favour of the establishment of the Solidarity tax on wealth in 1980 (implemented in 1981). She also voted in favour of abortion and looser divorce regulations as well as the repeal of the death penalty.

Personal life, death and legacy
She married Emeric Gros; they had four children, Olivier, France, François and Catherine.

Gros died on 11 March 1985 in Meulan-en-Yvelines, France. The Place Brigitte-Gros, a town square, and the Centre Brigitte Gros, a hospital, both of which are based in Meulan, are named in her memory. Meanwhile, a ceremony to commemorate the 30th anniversary of her death was held in Meulan on 13 February 2016.

Works

References

1925 births
1985 deaths
20th-century French journalists
20th-century French novelists
20th-century French women politicians
20th-century French women writers
French people of German-Jewish descent
French people of Polish-Jewish descent
French Resistance members
French Senators of the Fifth Republic
French women journalists
French women novelists
People from Meulan-en-Yvelines
People from Saint-Germain-en-Laye
Recipients of the Croix de Guerre 1939–1945 (France)
Senators of Yvelines
Women mayors of places in France
Women members of the Senate (France)